Yaron Golan (April 26, 1949 – January 23, 2007) was an Israeli publisher.

Yaron Golan, originally a literature columnist in Haaretz, established a publishing company in 1990. While refusing to submit to conventional rules of publishing only popular or profitable books, he used to take on himself to publish every book submitted to him, publishing over 1000 books, often at a personal loss. However he still was the publisher of many important works, including anthologies by Nathan Zach and Avot Yeshurun. Golan died unexpectedly of cardiac arrest on January 23, 2007, and was buried the following day in Tel-Aviv.

External links

1949 births
2007 deaths
20th-century Israeli businesspeople
Israeli columnists
Israeli publishers (people)
Burials at Yarkon Cemetery